The Hanoi Capital Command of the People's Army of Vietnam, is directly under the responsibility of the Ministry of Defense of Vietnam, tasked to organise, build, manage and command armed forces defending Hanoi, the capital of Vietnam.

History 
The predecessor of Hanoi Capital Command was established in October 1945 as Hanoi Special Zone (lit. Khu đặc biệt Hà Nội). By November 1946, the state was reorganized into 12 War Zones （）. Hanoi was reorganized into the 11th War Zone, also known as the Hanoi Front. When the French Indochina War broke out on 19 December 1946, the Hanoi Front was annexed into 2nd War Zone. From 1 November 1948, 2nd War Area was placed directly under the authority of 3rd Joint Zone （）, but by May 1949, Hanoi was split to reform the independent Hanoi Front again, falling under the command of the PAVN General Command. It was maintained until after 1954 under the name Hanoi Zone. By 1957, the General Command established troops of Hanoi under the control of General Command until 1 August 1964, when it was placed directly under the 3rd Military Region. However, in September 1964, it was reorganized again into the independent Capital Command. On 5 March 1979, by Ordinance 28-LCT, the Capital Military Region was established on the basis of the Capital Command, to manage militarily the city of Hanoi. In 1999, the jurisdiction of the Capital Military Region expanded to include the old Hà Tây province (merged with Hanoi since 2008).

On May 29th 2008, during the 3rd session of the 12th National Assembly, the National Assembly has approved Resolution 15 on the expansion of the jurisdiction of Hanoi to include the whole Hà Tây province, Mê Linh district of Vĩnh Phúc province and 4 wards (Đông Xuân, Tiến Xuân, Yên Bình, Yên Trung) of Lương Sơn district in Hòa Bình province. During the execution phase of Resolution 15, the (then) President Nguyễn Minh Triết issued Executive Order no. 16/2008/L-CTN to reorganize the Capital Military Region into the Hanoi Capital Command. Right after that, the (then) Minister of National Defence Phùng Quang Thanh issued Decision no. 2192/QĐ-BQP to incorporate Hà Tây provice Military Command, Hanoi city Military Command and Mê Linh district Military Command (then under the jurisdiction of Vĩnh Phúc province Military Command in the 2nd Military Region) into the new Hanoi Capital Command.

Command leadership 

 Command Headquarters: Phạm Hùng road, Cầu Giấy district, Hà Nội city
 Commander: Lt. Gen. Nguyễn Quốc Duyệt 
 Political Commissar: Lt. Gen. Nguyễn Trọng Triển
 Deputy Commander, concurrently Chief of Staff: Maj. Gen. Bùi Trọng Quỳnh
 Deputy Commander: Maj. Gen. Đỗ Thái Sơn
 Deputy Commander: Maj. Gen. Nguyễn Đình Lưu
 Deputy Political Commissar: Maj. Gen. Nguyễn Xuân Yêm

Agencies
 Command Office
 Command Staff Department
 Department of Politics
 Division of Organization 
 Division of Cadre 
 Division of Policy 
 Division of Publicity and Training 
 Division of Cultural and Ideological Affairs
 Military Court 
 Military Procuratorate
 Museum of the Capital Military Command: No. 157, St. Đội Cấn, Quận Ba Đình, Hanoi
 Department of Logistics  
 Department of Military Technology

Units
 301st Infantry Division  
 452nd Artillery Regiment
 47th Tank-Armored Battalion  
 610th Communication Battalion
 103rd Military Police Battalion
 544th Military Engineer Battalion
 18th Commando Battalion

Successive Commander and Leadership

Special Zone of Hanoi (1945-1946) 
 Commander: Vương Thừa Vũ
 Chief of Staff: Hoàng Văn Khánh

War Zone 11 (1946) 
 Commander: Vương Thừa Vũ
 Chief of Staff:? 
 Political Commissioners: Trần Độ

War Zone 2 (1946-1949) 
 Commander: Hoàng Sâm 
 Chief of Staff: Lê Hiến Mai

Front Hanoi (1949-1957) 
 Commander: Phùng Thế Tài
 Chief of Staff: Trần Quốc Hoàn

The Troops of Hanoi (1957-1964) 
 Commander: Col. Vũ Văn Sự 
 Chief of Staff:?

Command of Capital (1964-1979) 
 Commander: Snr. Col. Lê Nam Thắng 
 Political Commissioners: Trần Vỹ

Capital Military Zone (1979-present)

Commander 
 Lt. Gen. Đồng Sĩ Nguyên (1979–1980) 
 Maj. Gen. Lư Giang (1980–1989)  
 Lt. Gen. Chu Duy Kính (1989–1997) 
 Maj. Gen. Phạm Văn Tánh (1997–2002) 
 Maj. Gen. Nguyễn Như Hoạt (2002–2008)  
 Lt. Gen. Phí Quốc Tuấn (2008–2015)  
 Maj. Gen. Nguyễn Doãn Anh (2015–2018)  
 Maj. Gen. Nguyễn Hồng Thái (2018–2019)  
 Maj. Gen. Nguyễn Quốc Duyệt (2019–present)

Political Commissioners, Deputy Commanders of Politics
 Lt. Gen. Trần Độ (1946–1950) 
 Trần Vỹ (1964–1969) 
 Maj. Gen. Đoàn Phụng (1969–1973) 
 Maj. Gen. Hoàng Kim (1979–1983) 
 Maj. Gen. Chu Duy Kính (1986–1989)  
 Lt. Gen. Nguyễn Đăng Sáp (2007–2008)
 Maj. Gen. Phùng Đình Thảo (2008–2010)  
 Lt. Gen. Lê Hùng Mạnh (2010–2015)
 Lt. Gen. Nguyễn Thế Kết (2015–2019)
 Maj. Gen. Nguyễn Trọng Triển (2019–present)

Deputy Commander cum Chief of Staff
 Lê Hiến Mai 
 Trần Quốc Hoàn 
 Maj. Gen. Bùi Viết Chương 
 Maj. Gen. Tạ Đình Hiểu 
 Maj. Gen. Trịnh Thanh Vân 
 Maj. Gen. Bùi Minh Thứ 
 Maj. Gen. Lê Hải Bình (-2008)
 Maj. Gen. Nguyễn Văn Nghinh (2008-2010)
 Senior Colonel Nguyễn Doãn Anh (2013-2015)
 Maj. Gen. Bùi Trọng Quỳnh (2015–present)

References 

Military regions of the People's Army of Vietnam
Military units and formations established in 2008